The Cathedral of the Holy Virgin Protection is a Ukrainian Orthodox church located in Mariupol, Ukraine.

History 
The stone building was built between 2007 and 2020 and designed by architect Stanislaw Stolow (Russian: Станислав Столов). The bell tower of the church has ten bells. They were installed in 2012, the main bell weighs 4.2 tons, and the weight of the smallest bell is 18 kilograms. The largest cross weighs two tons, and the weight of the side cross is 730 kilograms. The height of the cathedral is 84.3 meters.

See also 

 List of cathedrals in Ukraine

References

External links 

Cathedrals in Ukraine
Culture in Mariupol
Buildings and structures in Mariupol
Ukrainian Orthodox Church (Moscow Patriarchate) cathedrals
Buildings and structures destroyed during the 2022 Russian invasion of Ukraine